Ananthagiri Hills is located in Vikarabad district, Telangana, India. The water flows from these hills to Osman Sagar, also known as Gandipet lake, and Himayathsagar.

It is one of the dense forests in Telangana. Ananthagiri Temple is located in this forested area. It is the birthplace of Musi river, also called as Muchkunda River, which flows through Hyderabad, 5 km from Vikarabad.

It is one of the earliest habitat areas. Ancient caves, medieval fort structures and temple shows the antiquity of this area.

Musi River 

The Musi River, originates in Ananthagiri Hills 90 kilometers to the west of Hyderabad and flowed due east for almost all of its course. It joins the Krishna River at Wadapally in Nalgonda district after covering a total distance of about 240 km.

Tourist attractions near Ananthagiri Hills

Anantha Padmanabha Swamy Temple 
This temple is located in Ananthagiri hills, about 75 kilometers from Hyderabad. Lord Vishnu is in the form of Sri Anantha Padmanabha Swamy and Ananthagiri is named after him. There is also a hotel near this temple which is operated by the Telangana Government.

Nagasamudram Lake 

Near the temple, there is this lake called Nagasamudram Lake or kotipally reservoir which is located near to a dam and at a distance of regarding 20 km from Ananthagiri hills. The lake is also known as Kotipally Reservoir as it is also a masonry dam. It offers one of the most serene views during monsoon seasons.

Trekking 

There are two trekking trails in the forests, one that begins from the Anantha Padmanabha Swamy Temple and another that begins about 0.5 kilometres from the temple, towards Kerelli.

References 

Hills of Telangana
Tourist attractions in Hyderabad, India
Ranga Reddy district